Hanna – Folge deinem Herzen is a German television series.

See also
List of German television series

External links
 

2010 German television series debuts
2010 German television series endings
German-language television shows
ZDF original programming